El Rito, (Spanish for The Little River), is an unincorporated community in Rio Arriba County, New Mexico, United States.

El Rito was one of the first Spanish settlements in the Jicarilla Apache lands north of Santa Fe, being settled about 1807. San Juan Nepomuceno Catholic Church is in the town, built between 1827 and 1832. This church has been erroneously claimed to be the oldest church in New Mexico despite multiple churches being built more than 200 year prior to it. The church was restored in the 1980s.

El Rito is the home of the Carson National Forest Service – El Rito Ranger District, the El Rito Public Library, the Las Clinicas del Norte, and a campus of Northern New Mexico College.

Originally named El Rito Colorado (the red creek), it took its name from the creek that passes through the village. Tewas call the El Rito region "pink below place" for the El Rito Mountains, known to them as the pink mountains. El Rito is the home to a growing number of artists. The El Rito Studio Tour is held in early October Among the artists living in this tiny New Mexico village are Nicholas Herrera known as “The El Rito Santero” and  David Michael Kennedy both of whom have work in the Smithsonian.

El Rito is surrounded by the Carson National Forest.

Sources

Unincorporated communities in Rio Arriba County, New Mexico
Spanish-American culture in New Mexico
Unincorporated communities in New Mexico